The Keighley and District Local History Society (KDLHS) is an English local history society covering the town of Keighley, West Yorkshire, and its surrounding area. It was founded in 2004, following the Centenary of Keighley Library.

The society is active in the preservation of local and family history resources, and is currently in the process of digitalising their archive to make the resources more easily available to fellow researchers in both the local community and world-wide.

Regular meetings are held every second Wednesday of the month, in the Local Studies Library in Keighley Library. The meetings allow members to listen to expert speakers in their specialist area of local history, and to be updated on Society business.

History 
In November 2004, a small group of historians came together to form an organisation dedicated to preserving and documenting the local history of Keighley. . The "Keighley and District Local History Society" was founded.

In May 2006, the society launched a website to expand their presence within the area. Within two months they had attracted over 10,000 visitors.

In 2010 it was announced that the society could face folding after a lack of volunteers. The society's then publicly secretary, Pat Williams, told the towns local newspaper, The Keighley news, that:  "We are worried that the society will fold if we don't find some help soon and that would be such a shame as members and guests all say how much they enjoy the speaker nights and the trips. We need at least two more committee members." As a result of the plea, the group soon announced that they had been saved following Keighley Archaeology and History Society, run by teenager Lewis Parker, being merged into the organisation. Lewis became the society's events coordinator, and his father, Andrew, became publicity officer.

In June 2014, the Society hit the headlines when its treasurer, Dan Moorhouse, had been convicted of stealing £8,000 – between February and May 2013- of Lottery funding the group had been awarded. Moorhouse's deceit was uncovered when Andy Wade, the chairman of the society at the time had contacted the bank and found that Moorhouse had made a number of unauthorised transactions from the society's bank to his personal account. He had also forged the signature of the society's secretary. Moorhouse was given a suspended 15-month prison sentence and ordered to repay the money, which would be taken from his benefits. However, Moorhouse delayed repaying the money which forced the society to suspend plans and projects for more than a year.

Committee members 
Laurence Brocklesby (President), Joyce Newton (Chair & Collections Co-ordinator), Anne-Marie Dewhirst (Treasurer), Paula Dobson (Minutes Secretary),  Sarah Wood-Ripley (Publicity and Speakers Liaison), Christine Binns (Research and Cataloguing), Steve Brown (Organisation, Collections and Cataloguing), Tim Neal (Social Networking)

Former Committee members 
Barbara Klempka (Secretary), Laurence Brocklesby (Former Chairman), Jan Perkins (web master, and archivist), Lewis Parker (Social Media and Events Co-ordinator), Andrew Parker (Publicity Secretary)

References 

History organisations based in the United Kingdom
Organisations based in Bradford
Keighley
2004 establishments in England
Organizations established in 2004
History of the City of Bradford